Apamea occidens, the western apamea, is a moth of the family Noctuidae. The species was first described by Augustus Radcliffe Grote in 1878. It is native to western North America as far east as Alberta and Kansas.

References

Apamea (moth)
Moths of North America
Moths described in 1878
Taxa named by Augustus Radcliffe Grote